Arthur Rozenfeld (born February 8, 1995) is a French-Israeli professional basketball player who plays point guard for Hapoel Gilboa Galil of the Israeli Basketball Premier League.

Early life
Rozenfeld was born in Bron, France. He is 6-0 (183 cm) tall, and weighs 182 pounds (83 kg).

Professional career
On July 22, 2015, Rozenfeld signed with the French team Boulogne, where he was Garrett Sim's replacement. He averaged 8.1 points and 3.9 assists per game, in 2015-16.

On June 22, 2016, Rozenfeld signed with the French team Chorale Roanne in the LNB Pro A to become titular leader, averaged 14.5 points and 4.5 assists (9th-best in the league) per game with a .919 free throw percentage (third-best in the league), and was selected most improved of Pro B at the end of season.

He joined the French team Élan Chalon on May 30, 2017. In June 2018, he quit the club. Rozenfeld signed with the French team JL Bourg in the LNB Pro A for a one-year deal.

On July 1, 2019, he signed with the French team Vichy-Clermont Métropole Basket of LNB Pro B. He averaged 7.8 points and 3.4 assists per game.

On December 5, 2022, Rozenfeld signed with Hapoel Gilboa Galil of the Israeli Basketball Premier League.

International play
Rozenfeld played for Team France in the 2011 FIBA Europe Under-16 Championship, 2012 FIBA Under-17 World Championship, 2013 U18 Euro Championship A, 2014 U20 Euro Championship A, and 2015 FIBA Europe Under-20 Championship.

References

External links
Twitter page

1995 births
Living people
ASVEL Basket players
Chorale Roanne Basket players
Élan Chalon players
French emigrants to Israel
French men's basketball players
Israeli men's basketball players
JA Vichy-Clermont Métropole players
JL Bourg-en-Bresse players
People from Bron
Point guards
SOMB Boulogne-sur-Mer players
Sportspeople from Lyon Metropolis